Mohd Nasriq Bin Baharom (born 8 February 1987) is a Malaysian footballer who plays as a defender for Malaysia M3 League side Imigresen.

Nasriq was a member of the Malaysia national team and a member of the 2009 Laos Sea Games Football Gold medal winning squad.

References

External links
 
 Profile at Selangorfc.com

1987 births
Living people
Malaysian footballers
People from Selangor
Southeast Asian Games gold medalists for Malaysia
Southeast Asian Games medalists in football
Association football defenders
Competitors at the 2009 Southeast Asian Games
Malaysia international footballers
Negeri Sembilan FA players